The Claude E. Shannon Award of the IEEE Information Theory Society was created to honor consistent and profound contributions to the field of information theory. Each Shannon Award winner is expected to present a Shannon Lecture at the following IEEE International Symposium on Information Theory. It is a prestigious prize in information theory, covering technical contributions at the intersection of mathematics, communication engineering, and theoretical computer science.

It is named for Claude E. Shannon, who was also the first recipient.

Recipients
The following people have received the Claude E. Shannon Award:

 1972 – Claude E. Shannon
 1974 – David S. Slepian
 1976 – Robert M. Fano
 1977 – Peter Elias
 1978 – Mark Semenovich Pinsker
 1979 – Jacob Wolfowitz
 1981 – W. Wesley Peterson
 1982 – Irving S. Reed
 1983 – Robert G. Gallager
 1985 – Solomon W. Golomb
 1986 – William Lucas Root
 1988 – James Massey
 1990 – Thomas M. Cover
 1991 – Andrew Viterbi
 1993 – Elwyn Berlekamp
 1994 – Aaron D. Wyner
 1995 – George David Forney
 1996 – Imre Csiszár
 1997 – Jacob Ziv
 1998 – Neil Sloane
 1999 – Tadao Kasami
 2000 – Thomas Kailath
 2001 – Jack Keil Wolf
 2002 – Toby Berger
 2003 – Lloyd R. Welch
 2004 – Robert McEliece
 2005 – Richard Blahut
 2006 – Rudolf Ahlswede
 2007 – Sergio Verdú
 2008 – Robert M. Gray
 2009 – Jorma Rissanen
 2010 – Te Sun Han
 2011 – Shlomo Shamai (Shitz)
 2012 – Abbas El Gamal
 2013 – Katalin Marton
 2014 – János Körner
 2015 – Robert Calderbank
 2016 – Alexander Holevo
 2017 – David Tse
 2018 – Gottfried Ungerboeck
 2019 – Erdal Arıkan
 2020 – Charles Bennett
 2021 – Alon Orlitsky
 2022 – Raymond W. Yeung
 2023 – Rüdiger Urbanke

See also 

 List of computer science awards

References

External links 
 IEEE Information Theory Society page
 Claude E. Shannon Award & recipients

Information science awards
Awards established in 1972
IEEE society and council awards